Inārs Kivlenieks (born 4 July 1986 in Riga) is a Latvian luger who has competed since 2005. His best Luge World Cup season finish was 20th in men's doubles in 2006–07.

Kivlenieks' best finish at the FIL World Luge Championships was 28th in men's singles at Oberhof in 2008. His best finish at the FIL European Luge Championships was 13th in men's singles at Cesana Pariol in 2008.

Kivilenieks competed at the 2010 Winter Olympics where he finished 18th in the men's singles event.

References

External links
 
 
 
 

1986 births
Living people
Sportspeople from Riga
Latvian male lugers
Olympic lugers of Latvia
Lugers at the 2010 Winter Olympics
Lugers at the 2014 Winter Olympics
Lugers at the 2018 Winter Olympics